Mad About Music is a 1938 American musical film directed by Norman Taurog and starring Deanna Durbin, Herbert Marshall, and Gail Patrick. Based on a story by Marcella Burke and Frederick Kohner, the film is about a girl at an exclusive boarding school who invents an exciting father. When her schoolmates doubt his existence, she has to produce him. Mad About Music received Academy Award nominations for Best Art Direction, Best Cinematography, Best Music, and Best Original Story.

Plot
Gwen Taylor (Gail Patrick) is a famous Hollywood film star and about to become more famous. On her manager's advice, she has concealed from the press the fact that she's a widow with a fourteen-year-old daughter, Gloria (Deanna Durbin). Gloria lives in a girls-only boarding school in Switzerland.

Gloria never sees her mother and never knew her father, who died when she was just a baby; he was a navy pilot during wartime. She has invented a fictitious 'father', from who she receives letters, which she writes herself. But the other girls are getting curious and Gloria decides to kid them that he's about to visit her. Felice (Helen Parrish), another girl at the school, is suspicious and tries to prove that her father doesn't exist.

The girls often meet the boys from a nearby boarding school. One of them, Tommy, (Jackie Moran), has a crush on her, and she likes him as well. At a church service, Gloria sings, "Ave Maria (Bach/Gounod)" with a boy's choir.

Gloria needs to quickly find someone to act as her father for a day. She goes to the train station to meet her "father" and the man she picks at random is Richard Todd (Herbert Marshall), an English composer on holiday, accompanied by Tripps (Arthur Treacher), his valet/secretary. Amused at her presumption, he decides to play along, and comes to her school, acting like he really is her father.

Gloria discovers that her mother will be visiting Paris and that Richard is also planning to visit Paris on business. She stows away on a train and manages to persuade Richard to pay her fare.

In Paris, Richard discovers who Gloria's mother is and decides that it's about time for a reunion between her and Gloria. At a press conference, Gwen admits to having a fourteen-year-old daughter. Mother and daughter are tearfully reunited and Gwen is grateful to Richard for bringing Gloria back to her. A budding romance between Gwen and Richard is now obvious and the movie ends with Gloria singing, "A Serenade to the Stars" while the girls from her school, her mother and Richard sit happily together.

Cast

 Deanna Durbin as Gloria Harkinson
 Herbert Marshall as Richard Todd / "Mr. Harkinson"
 Gail Patrick as Gwen Taylor, Gloria's mother
 Arthur Treacher as Tripps
 William Frawley as Dusty Turner
 Marcia Mae Jones as Olga
 Helen Parrish as Felice
 Jackie Moran as Tommy
 Elisabeth Risdon as Annette Fusenot
 Nana Bryant as Louise Fusenot
 Christian Rub as Pierre
 Sid Grauman as himself

Production
The film was announced in March 1937. It was based on an original story by Frederich Kohner and Marcella Burke. The original title was Father Meet Mother.

 The producer was Joe Pasternak; Henry Koster, who had directed Durbin's first two films, went on to The Rage of Paris.

In October Norman Taurog signed to direct.

In November Herbert Marshall signed to star. The film would be the first for Durbin's next contract with Universal starting at $1,250 a week with a $10,000 bonus for each film made.

Filming started November 1937. The Vienna Boys Choir, touring the country, appeared in the movie.

The following month Gail Patrick was cast as Durbin's mother.

Awards and nominations
The film received four Academy Award nominations:
 Best Art Direction (Jack Otterson)
 Best Cinematography (Joseph Valentine)
 Best Music Scoring (Charles Previn, Frank Skinner)
 Best Original Story (Marcella Burke, Frederick Kohner)

References

External links
 
 
 
 

1938 films
1930s musical comedy-drama films
American musical comedy-drama films
American black-and-white films
Films directed by Norman Taurog
Films set in Paris
Films set in Switzerland
Universal Pictures films
Films produced by Joe Pasternak
Films set in boarding schools
1938 comedy films
1930s English-language films
1930s American films